Alfred Arthur (born 25 December 1986) is a Ghanaian international football defender.

Career
Started with Michael Essien and Ofosu Amoah in a club called Rainbow Stars (Paa Badu Babies) in the Central Region, Ghana and later joined the Goldfields Soccer Academy from where he graduated to join the senior team Ashanti Gold SC where he will play between 2004 and 2007.

In August 2007 was on trial at German 2. Bundesliga club Greuther Fürth, in January 2008 Alfred Arthur joined with Ghana 2007 goalkeeper Emmanuel Clottey the Austrian Bundesliga team FC Wacker Innsbruck. In August 2008 he joined Serbian SuperLiga club FK Jagodina on a free transfer In Jagodina he played along with another Ghanaian footballer, Kennedy Boateng, but after one year in Serbia he turned back to Ghana.

In summer 2009 he signed with Ghana Premier League club Ashanti Gold SC. After one season, he moved, in summer 2010, to another Ghanaian top league club Berekum Chelsea.

National team
He made his debut for the Black Stars in a friendly against Brazil on 27 March 2007, by coming on for the last ten minutes as a substitute. He was part of the Ghana squad at the 2011 African Nations Championship having played the last group match against Niger in the 0–1 defeat and consequent elimination.

Honours
Berekum Chelsea
Ghana Premier League: 2010–11

References

External links
 
 Alfred Arthur stats from Serbia at Srbijafudbal

1986 births
Living people
Footballers from Accra
Ghanaian footballers
Ghana international footballers
Ghanaian expatriate footballers
Association football defenders
FC Wacker Innsbruck (2002) players
Expatriate footballers in Austria
Ghanaian expatriate sportspeople in Austria
Ghanaian expatriate sportspeople in Serbia
FK Jagodina players
Serbian SuperLiga players
Expatriate footballers in Serbia
Ashanti Gold SC players
Berekum Chelsea F.C. players
2011 African Nations Championship players
Ghana A' international footballers